John Thomas Chambers (born August 23, 1949) is the former executive chairman and CEO of Cisco Systems.

Early life

Chambers was born on August 23, 1949, in Cleveland, Ohio to John Tuner "Jack" and June Chambers. His mother was a psychiatrist and his father was an obstetrician. The family resided in Kanawha City, West Virginia.

When Chambers was nine years old, he was diagnosed with dyslexia. Aided by a therapist, Chambers learned to cope with his disability.

Education
He holds a Bachelor of Science / Bachelor of Arts degree in business and a J.D. degree from West Virginia University and a master of business administration degree in finance and management from Kelley School of Business, Indiana University. Previously, he also attended the School of Engineering at Duke University from 1967 to 1968, where he was a brother of the Sigma Alpha Epsilon fraternity.

Career
After obtaining his MBA, Chambers began his career in technology sales at IBM 1976–1983 when he was 27 years old. At 34 years old, in 1983, Chambers joined Wang Laboratories, later becoming Vice President of US Operations in 1987.  During Chambers' time at the company, Wang's profits declined dramatically from $2 billion 1989 to a $700 million loss in 1990. A year later, Chambers left Wang to join Cisco, which had gone public on February 16, 1990.

In 1995 Chambers became CEO of Cisco, a position he held until 2015. He had also been promoted to board chairman in 2006. During his tenure as CEO, the company's annual sales grew from $1.9 billion to $49.2 billion. On July 27, 2015, Chuck Robbins replaced Chambers as CEO of Cisco Systems. Following his tenure as CEO, Chambers remained on the board until 2017, when he retired from the company. In October 2016, he was reported to own over 1.7 million Cisco shares worth approximately US$54 million. He holds the honorary title of Chairman Emeritus but holds no authority within the company.

In early 2021, Chambers became a member of the board of directors of Quantum Metric, a software company based in Colorado Springs.

John Chambers is chairman of the Board of Pensando. Chambers served on the board of directors of myCFO.

Personal
Chambers and his wife Elaine have two children, Lindsay and John.

Political contributions
Chambers has made political donations totaling over $180,000 to the Democratic Party and over $1,000,000 to the Republican Party.  He served as a co-chair in Republican John McCain's 2008 presidential bid.

Since 2010, Chambers has also served as a commissioner for the Broadband Commission for Digital Development, which leverages broadband technologies as a key enabler for social and economic development.

West Virginia University
On November 9, 2018, the College of Business and Economics at West Virginia University was renamed the John Chambers College of Business and Economics.

Awards
Chambers has received various awards and honors for corporate philanthropy.

 CNN's Top 25 Most Powerful People
 Time Magazine's "100 Most Influential People"
 Clinton Global Citizen Award
 U.S. State Department Top Corporate Social Responsibility Award
 Woodrow Wilson Award for Corporate Citizenship
 2009 Silicon Valley Education Foundation Pioneer Business Leader Award
 2012 Franklin Institute's Bower Award for Business Leadership
 2015 Harvard Business Review: The 100 Best-Performing CEOs in the World
 In 2016, John Chambers was honored with an Edison Achievement Award for his commitment to innovation throughout his career.

Compensation
 2014 – Total compensation of $16,488,184, which included a base salary of $1,100,000, a cash bonus of $2,500,000, stocks granted of $12,876,709, and other compensation worth $11,475.
 2013 – Total compensation of $21,049,501, which included a base salary of $1,100,000, a cash bonus of $4,700,080, stocks granted of $15,237,652, and other compensation worth $11,769.
 2012 – Total compensation of $11,687,666, which included a base salary of $375,000, a cash bonus of $3,953,376, stocks granted of $7,348,265, and other compensation worth $11,025.
 2011 – Total compensation of $12,890,829 which included a base salary of $375,000, no cash bonus, stocks granted of  $12,500,100, and other compensation worth $11,025.
 2009 – Total compensation of $12,788,498, which included a base salary of $375,000, a cash bonus of $2,031,000, stocks granted of $10,372,500, and other compensation worth $9,998.
 2008 – Total compensation of $18,767,149, which included a base salary of $375,000, a cash bonus of $3,002,802, stocks granted of $6,442,000, and options granted of $8,938,260.
 2007 – Total compensation of $12,801,773, which included a base salary of $350,096, a cash bonus of $3,500,000 and options granted of $8,944,000.

Books
Chambers is mentioned in books about his management and leadership style.
 John Chambers and The Cisco Way (Waters, John K., Wiley, 2002) 
 The Eye of the Storm: How John Chambers Steered Cisco Through the Technology Collapse (Slater, Robert, HarperBusiness, 2003) 
He is the author of one book.
 Connecting the Dots: Lessons for Leadership in a Startup World (Chambers, John, Hachette, 2018) 
 Achieving Meaningful Success – Unleash the Power of Me (Vivek Mansingh, Rachna Thakurdas, 2022 (Penguin)) ISBN 978-0-14-345646-9

References

Further reading
 Leibovich, Mark. The New Imperialists (Prentice Hall, 2002) pp 105–138. online

External links 
 

1949 births
American chairpersons of corporations
American chief executives of manufacturing companies
American technology chief executives
Cisco people
Kelley School of Business alumni
Living people
People with dyslexia
Businesspeople from Cleveland
West Virginia University College of Law alumni
Recipients of the Padma Bhushan in trade and industry
Duke University Pratt School of Engineering alumni
Businesspeople from Charleston, West Virginia